is a Japanese writer. She has won the Bungei Prize, the Mishima Yukio Prize, the Noma Literary Prize, and the Akutagawa Prize.

Early life and education 
Kashimada was born in Tokyo, Japan. In 1998, while still a university student, she submitted her work Nihiki for the Bungei Prize, winning the 35th Bungei Prize. She later graduated from Shirayuri Women's University after writing a thesis on Julia Kristeva.

Career 
In 2005 Kashimada won the 18th Mishima Yukio Prize for Rokusendo no ai (Love at Six Thousand Degrees), a story set in Nagasaki and loosely inspired by Marguerite Duras' screenplay for Hiroshima mon amour. In 2007 Kashimada won the 29th Noma Literary Prize for  Pikarudī no sando. In 2012, after having her work nominated for the Akutagawa Prize multiple times and almost sharing the award with Akiko Akazome in 2010, Kashimada won the 147th Akutagawa Prize for Meido meguri (Touring the Land of the Dead).

Personal life 
Kashimada is a member of the Japanese Orthodox Church and is married to a member of the clergy.

Recognition
 1998 35th Bungei Prize
 2005 18th Mishima Yukio Prize
 2007 29th Noma Literary New Face Prize
 2012 147th Akutagawa Prize (2012上)

Works

In Japanese
 , Kawade Shobō Shinsha, 1999, 
 , Kawade Shobō Shinsha, 2000, 
 , Kawade Shobō Shinsha, 2003, 
 , Shinchosha, 2004, 
 , Shinchosha, 2005, 
 , Shinchosha, 2006, 
 , Kodansha, 2007, 
 , Kodansha, 2009, 
 , Bungeishunjū, 2009, 
 , Kawade Shobō Shinsha, 2009, 
 , Kodansha, 2011,  
 , Kawade Shobō Shinsha, 2012, 
 , Shueisha, 2012, 
 , Shinchosha, 2013, 
 , Bungeishunjū, 2013, 
 , Shinchosha, 2014, 
 , Kawade Shobō Shinsha, 2016, 
 , Bungeishunjū, 2016,

In English
 "The Interview", trans. Jocelyne Allen, Japan Earthquake Charity Literature, 2012
 Touring the Land of the Dead, trans. Haydn Trowell, Europa Editions, 2021,

References

1976 births
Living people
21st-century Japanese novelists
21st-century Japanese women writers
Japanese women novelists
Akutagawa Prize winners
Writers from Tokyo
Christian writers